Ba Bể Lake (Ba means Three, Bể is from the Tay language word pé, meaning "lake") is the largest natural lake in Vietnam. It is located in Nam Mẫu commune, Ba Bể district, Bắc Kạn Province in the Northeast region of the country.

Having been formed approximately 200 million years ago, the lake is surrounded by limestone cliffs, which in turn are covered by primary forests. The lake comprises three zones named Pé Lầm, Pé Lù, and Pé Lèng. Three rivers, named Năng, Tả Han, and Nam Cường, are the main inflows of the lake. The Năng river enters the lake through a large waterfall called Đầu Đẳng. In the lake there are also three islands, named Án Mã, Khẩu Cúm, and Po Gia Mải (literally "Widow's Island").

Ba Bể Lake is a featured geographical science and is a biodiversity reservoir. It is a part of the Ba Bể National Park.

It is home to a range of animals and plants.

The legend of Ba Be lake 

Once upon a time, there was a poor old woman. Villagers distrusted her because she seemed dirty and ugly-looking. Fortunately, she was eventually helped by a good-hearted mother and her son.

The truth was that the old lady was a fairy. She told the mother and son that the village and surrounding area were about to be struck by a natural disaster. Despite her warnings, no one believed her, except for the mother and son, who began to build a boat.

The next night, a terrible rainstorm began to engulf the village.

The mother and son, who had prepared their boat beforehand, survived and saved many people from drowning.

The village was subsequently submerged in water and gradually formed into the current Ba Bể Lake.

References

External links

Ba Be Lake in UNESCO website

Lakes of Vietnam
Landforms of Bắc Kạn province
Ramsar sites in Vietnam